Appen is a hamlet in the Dutch province of Gelderland.

It was first mentioned in 1299 as Appenses. The etymology is unknown. The postal authorities have placed it under Voorst. In 1840, it was home to 808 people. Nowadays, it consists of about 20 houses.

References

Populated places in Gelderland
Voorst